

21001–21100 

|-
| 21001 Trogrlic || 1987 GF || Yvan, Marie, Jean, Émilienne, Yvonne and Liliane Trogrlic, respectively grandfather, grandmother, uncle, mother and aunts of the discoverer || 
|-id=009
| 21009 Agilkia ||  || Agilkia, the name of an island on the Nile in Egypt. || 
|-id=010
| 21010 Kishon ||  || Ephraim Kishon, Israeli author, journalist, satirist, and script-writer || 
|-id=014
| 21014 Daishi ||  || Daishi grade school, Kōchi, Japan, attended by the discoverer 1937–1943 || 
|-id=015
| 21015 Shigenari || 1988 UF || Shigenari Oonishi (born 1946) is a famous illustrator, who has designed many record covers. He opened his private art museum, Shigechan Land, in his hometown (Tsubetsu town, Hokkaido, Japan) in 2001. || 
|-id=016
| 21016 Miyazawaseiroku || 1988 VA || Seiroku Miyazawa, Japanese publisher, brother of Kenji Miyazawa, the author of Night On The Milky Way Train and The Twin Stars || 
|-id=022
| 21022 Ike || 1989 CR || Koichi Ike, Japanese friend and assistant of the discoverer || 
|-id=029
| 21029 Adorno ||  || Theodor W. Adorno (1903–1969), German philosopher and musicologist, was a leading figure in the Frankfurter Schule of critical theory. || 
|-id=033
| 21033 Akahirakiyozo || 1989 UM || Kiyozo Akahira (born 1941) is a science historian and an amateur astronomer. He has been a high school teacher of physics for more than 35 years. || 
|-id=035
| 21035 Iwabu || 1990 AE || Shimeichi Iwabu (born 1914) became enthralled with total eclipses after witnessing his first in Hokkaido in 1963. || 
|-id=036
| 21036 Nakamurayoshi ||  || Yoshihiro Nakamura (born 1947) retired from his planetarium manufacturing company in 2007 and is now well known as an amateur astronomer in Chiba Prefecture. || 
|-id=047
| 21047 Hodierna ||  || Giovanni Batista Hodierna, Italian (Sicilian) mathematician and astronomer. || 
|-id=050
| 21050 Beck ||  || Hans G. Beck, German astronomer and head of the department for astronomical instruments of Carl Zeiss, Jena || 
|-id=054
| 21054 Ojmjakon ||  || The coldest city on earth, Ojmjakon, lies in the Republic of Yakutia (Siberia, Russia), in the valley of the upper Indigirka river, at 740 metres above sea level. With an average temperature of -48oC in January, it has a lowest record of -70oC. || 
|-id=057
| 21057 Garikisraelian ||  || Garik Israelian (born 1963), an astrophysicist at the Institute of Astrophysics, Tenerife, known for his studies of stellar abundances and observational evidence of the supernova origin of black holes. || 
|-id=059
| 21059 Penderecki ||  || Krzysztof Penderecki, Polish composer and conductor || 
|-id=062
| 21062 Iasky ||  || Robert Iasky (born 1956), geophysicist with the Geological Survey of Western Australia, discovered the 120 km-diameter late Devonian Woodleigh impact structure in the Carnarvon Basin. In addition, he has found other probable impact structures, one in the Carnarvon Basin and two in the western Officer Basin. || 
|-id=064
| 21064 Yangliwei ||  || Yang Liwei, first Chinese citizen in space † || 
|-id=065
| 21065 Jamesmelka || 1991 NM || James Melka (born 1942), an amateur astronomer. || 
|-id=073
| 21073 Darksky || 1991 RE || Part of a worldwide initiative, Dark Sky Scotland promotes the use of Scotland's dark rural areas for astronomy outreach. Its events encourage the public to enjoy the night sky and learn how astronomers are exploring the wonders of the Universe || 
|-id=074
| 21074 Rügen ||  || The island of Rügen in the Baltic Sea, a popular resort || 
|-id=075
| 21075 Heussinger ||  || Adalbert Heussinger, Austrian Catholic Minorite, theologian and philosopher || 
|-id=076
| 21076 Kokoschka ||  || Oskar Kokoschka, Austrian Expressionist painter and poet || 
|-id=082
| 21082 Araimasaru ||  || Masaru Arai, Japanese amateur astronomer, discoverer of comet C/1991 A2 || 
|-id=087
| 21087 Petsimpallas ||  || Peter Simon Pallas, 18th/19th-century German naturalist and explorer, discoverer of pallasites, Pallas's cat and several other animals and plants || 
|-id=088
| 21088 Chelyabinsk ||  || Chelyabinsk, a city in the Urals, Siberia. || 
|-id=089
| 21089 Mochizuki || 1992 CQ || Seiji Mochizuki, Japanese designer of the 0.6-m reflector at Geisei Observatory || 
|}

21101–21200 

|-id=104
| 21104 Sveshnikov || 1992 PY || Mikhail Leonidovich Sveshnikov (born 1941) is a well-known expert in celestial mechanics and astrometry. He is Editor-in-Chief of the Russian Naval Astronomical Almanac. From 2001 to 2004, he headed the Laboratory of the astronomical yearbooks of the Institute of Applied Astronomy of the Russian Academy of Sciences || 
|-id=109
| 21109 Sünkel || 1992 RY || Hans Sünkel (born 1948), an Austrian mathematical geodesist and geoinformatician || 
|-id=110
| 21110 Karlvalentin ||  || Karl Valentin (1882–1948), German (Bavarian) actor, comedian, and writer || 
|-id=114
| 21114 Bernson ||  || Reysa Bernson (1904–1944) had a passion for science and after an encounter with Flammarion, who inspired her for astronomy, she founded the Astronomical Association of the North. During the 1937 Universal Exposition she directed the Paris planetarium.This led to the foundation of many new planetaria. || 
|-id=117
| 21117 Tashimaseizo ||  || Seizo Tashima (born 1940) is well known as an author of illustrated books. He has won many national and international prizes for his books and pictures. || 
|-id=118
| 21118 Hezimmermann ||  ||  (1926–2011), a German astronomer and director of the Jena Observatory from 1969 to 1978. His research included the interstellar medium and the collision of clouds. He was instrumental in the new study course of astronomy for student teachers in Germany. || 
|-id=121
| 21121 Andoshoeki || 1992 WV || Andō Shōeki (1703–1762) was a doctor and one of the foremost philosophers of early modern Japan.  He desired to create an equal and peaceful symbiotic society based on people's mutual aid. || 
|-id=125
| 21125 Orff ||  || Carl Orff (1895–1982), German composer, best known for his Carmina Burana || 
|-id=126
| 21126 Katsuyoshi ||  || Katsuyoshi Yoshimi (born 1951) is an amateur astrophotographer and has contributed to many minor-planet discoveries at Geisei Observatory by hyper-sensitizing films for use at the observatory || 
|-id=128
| 21128 Chapuis ||  || Grégoire Chapuis (1761–1794), Belgian surgeon and educator, mayor of Verviers, beheaded for blasphemy for his promotion of civil weddings || 
|-id=148
| 21148 Billramsey ||  || William ("Bill") D. Ramsey, American amateur astronomer who assisted in organizing the photographic glass plate archive of the 1.2-m Schmidt Oschin Telescope at Palomar Observatory || 
|-id=149
| 21149 Kenmitchell ||  || Ken Mitchell, Australian geological field assistant for the Australian Geological Survey Organization and other exploration groups, who discovered the shatter cones at Lawn Hill, Queensland, and at Amelia Creek in the Davenport Ranges of the Northern Territory || 
|-id=160
| 21160 Saveriolombardi || 1993 TJ || An expert in physics and mathematics, Saverio Lombardi (born 1924) has always shared his knowledge and experience with the astronomers at St. Lucia || 
|-id=161
| 21161 Yamashitaharuo ||  || Haruo Yamashita (born 1937) is the author of more than 500 works including novels and children's stories. He has been awarded many prizes including the Medal with Purple Ribbon from the Emperor of Japan. || 
|-id=166
| 21166 Nobuyukishouji || 1993 XH || Nobuyuki Maeda (born 1957) and Shouji Higasioka (born 1958) are brothers living in Aki city in Kochi prefecture. Nobuyuki, formerly a high school teacher, teaches astronomy at Geisel Observatory. Shouji is a comet hunter and volunteers for astronomy outreach activities. || 
|-id=182
| 21182 Teshiogawa ||  || Teshio River (Teshio-gawa) is a 256-km long river which runs through the northern part of Hokkaido into the Sea of Japan. Nayoro Observatory, equipped with the 1.6-m Pirka telescope, is located near this river. || 
|-id=187
| 21187 Setsuo || 1994 FY || Setsuo Fukushima (born 1961) was moved by astronomical images he first saw in middle school. His work as a volunteer lecturer at the Children's Astronomical Classroom at the Takamatsu City Planetarium spans over ten years. || 
|-id=188
| 21188 Kiyohiro || 1994 GN || Kiyohiro Kozai (born 1964) is well known as an enthusiastic amateur astronomer in Kagawa Prefecture. He is a popular lecturer to the families that come to hear him at the astronomical classrooms of his local community center. || 
|-id=192
| 21192 Seccisergio || 1994 NA || Sergio Secci (1956–1980) was a researcher and author who graduated with top honors at the University of Bologna || 
|}

21201–21300 

|-id=219
| 21219 Mascagni ||  || Pietro Mascagni (1863–1945), an Italian conductor and composer. || 
|-id=229
| 21229 Sušil ||  || František Sušil, Czech folklorist † || 
|-id=234
| 21234 Nakashima || 1995 WG || Takashi Nakashima, Japanese amateur astronomer, member of the Kumamoto Civil Astronomical Observatory || 
|-id=237
| 21237 Suematsu ||  || Kenji Suematsu (born 1966) teaches physics and earth sciences as a high school teacher in Nagasaki Prefecture. He is an enthusiastic teacher for students of all grades, from elementary through high school, and shows a particular passion for lectures on astronomy. || 
|-id=238
| 21238 Panarea ||  || Panarea, a volcanic island placed in the south of Italy. || 
|-id=250
| 21250 Kamikouchi ||  || Kamikouchi, a Japanese scenic point nominated as a "Special Natural Treasure" in 1952 || 
|-id=254
| 21254 Jonan ||  || Jonan, Kumamoto, Japan, where the Kumamoto Civil Astronomical Observatory is located, on the occasion of the observatory's twentieth anniversary || 
|-id=256
| 21256 Robertobattiston ||  || Roberto Battiston (born 1956) is an Italian experimental physicist specializing in detectors and technologies for fundamental, elementary and astroparticle physics. He holds the Chair of Experimental Physics at the University of Trento, and since 2014 has been President of the Italian Space Agency ASI. || 
|-id=257
| 21257 Jižní Čechy ||  || Jižní Čechy, region of the Czech republic †  || 
|-id=258
| 21258 Huckins ||  || Earle Knowlen Huckins III, American Deputy Associate Administrator in the Office of Space Science at NASA Headquarters || 
|-id=262
| 21262 Kanba ||  || Minatsu Kanba, Japanese member of the Matsue Astronomy Club and an observing partner of the discoverer || 
|-id=269
| 21269 Bechini || 1996 LG || Roberto Bechini, Italian amateur astronomer † || 
|-id=270
| 21270 Otokar || 1996 OK || Otokar Březina (Václav Jebavý), Czech lyric poet, and one of the leaders of the symbolist movement †  || 
|-id=275
| 21275 Tosiyasu ||  || Tosiyasu Funakosi, Japanese amateur astronomer || 
|-id=276
| 21276 Feller ||  || William (Vilim) Feller, Croatian-American mathematician || 
|-id=282
| 21282 Shimizuyuka ||  || Yuka Shimizu (born 2009) is the discoverer's granddaughter. Yuka is interested in the constellations and enjoys watching the stars with her parents at Geisei Observatory's public viewing nights. || 
|-id=284
| 21284 Pandion ||  || Pandion was a Greek fighter who helped Menestheus, the leader of the Athenian soldiers, to escape from the attack by Sarpedon || 
|-id=289
| 21289 Giacomel ||  || Luigino Giacomel, an engineer for the Italian company European Industrial Engineering. || 
|-id=290
| 21290 Vydra ||  || The Vydra, a river in southern Bohemia, Czech Republic †  || 
|-id=292
| 21292 Kanetakoichi ||  || Koichi Kaneta (born 1946) became enthralled with total eclipses after witnessing his first in Hokkaido, Japan in 1963. Since then, he has taken part in solar eclipse expeditions to every corner of the world. In China, he witnessed the 2009 total eclipse on what was his sixth expedition. || 
|-id=293
| 21293 Fujimototoyoshi ||  || Toyoshi Fujimoto (born 1960) worked for 37 years as a science teacher in a Japanese elementary school. He guided young people in astronomical observations and raised their interest in astronomy. || 
|-id=294
| 21294 Yamaguchiyuko ||  || Yuko Yamaguchi (1952–2019) was an artist who painted wooden tablets that were offered to a Shinto shrine or Buddhist temple when praying for divine protection. She was also active as an amateur astronomer in Hida Furukawa, Japan. || 
|}

21301–21400 

|-
| 21301 Zanin ||  || Antonio Zanin (1921–1997) was a respected Italian entrepreneur, active in the field of mechanical engineering and manufacturing and distinctly remembered by his employers for his ability to establish sincere and humane relationships || 
|-id=302
| 21302 Shirakamisanchi || 1996 XU || Shirakamisanchi is a mountain district spreading over Aomori Prefecture and Akita Prefecture, Japan. It is famous for a primeval forest of beech trees and was registered as a World Nature Heritage site in 1993 || 
|-id=306
| 21306 Marani ||  || Giorgio "Doddo" Marani, Italian mechanic, friend of the discoverer || 
|-id=311
| 21311 Servius ||  || Servius Tullius, sixth king of Rome, who constructed the first wall around the city || 
|-id=313
| 21313 Xiuyanyu ||  || Xiuyanyu, a reputed kind of jade produced in Xiuyan County, in northeastern China || 
|-id=326
| 21326 Nitta-machi ||  || Nitta-machi was a town with a population of 29,000 in county Nitta-Gun county, in the southeastern part of Gunma prefecture. In 2005, the town merged with Ota city, Ojima town and Yabuzuka-Honmachi town. || 
|-id=327
| 21327 Yabuzuka ||  || Yabuzuka, the abbreviated name for Yabuzuka-Honmachi town, in Nitta-Gun county, in the southeastern part of Gunma prefecture, had a population of 19 \, 000. In 2005 the town became part of new Ota city, when it merged with Ota city, Ojima town and Nitta town. || 
|-id=328
| 21328 Otashi ||  || Ota, Gunma prefecture, Japan || 
|-id=330
| 21330 Alanwhitman ||  || Alan Douglas Whitman (born 1946), a Canadian amateur astronomer and former weather service officer. || 
|-id=331
| 21331 Lodovicoferrari || 1997 BO || Lodovico Ferrari, 16th-century Italian mathematician || 
|-id=336
| 21336 Andyblanchard ||  || Andy Blanchard (born 1956) founded AstroCATS, an annualtelescope exhibit, in 2013, and won a Service Award from the Royal Astronomical Society of Canada in 2016. || 
|-id=346
| 21346 Marieladislav ||  || Marie Pravcová and Ladislav Pravec, parents of the discoverer † || 
|-id=348
| 21348 Toyoteru ||  || Toyoteru is a district in Niigata city, Niigata prefecture, famous for the festival Niigata So-Odori, which dates back to the seventeenth century. In Toyoteru, there is Japan's first child-daycare facility, Akazawa Hoikuen, established in 1890 || 
|-id=349
| 21349 Bevoke ||  || John Beverly "Bev" Oke (1928–2004) did his PhD at Princeton University and had an outstanding career in spectroscopy and instrument design for large telescopes. || 
|-id=350
| 21350 Billgardner ||  || William David Anstruther Gardner (born 1974), an amateur astronomer in Ingersoll, Ontario, active in the Royal Astronomical Society of Canada, London Centre. || 
|-id=351
| 21351 Bhagwat ||  || Samuel Mohun Bhagwat, American finalist in the 2005 Intel Science Talent Search (ISTS) † ‡ || 
|-id=355
| 21355 Pikovskaya ||  || Olga Pikovskaya, American finalist in the 2005 ISTS † || 
|-id=356
| 21356 Karlplank ||  || Karl James Plank, American finalist in the 2005 ISTS † || 
|-id=357
| 21357 Davidying ||  || David Qianli Ying, American finalist in the 2005 ISTS † || 
|-id=358
| 21358 Mijerbarany ||  || Michael Jeremy Barany, American finalist in the 2005 ISTS † || 
|-id=359
| 21359 Geng ||  || Sherri Yifan Geng, American finalist in the 2005 ISTS † || 
|-id=360
| 21360 Bobduff ||  || Robert Ian Duff (born 1946) is an amateur astronomer who has served as Librarian and Outreach Coordinator for the Royal Astronomical Society of Canada, London Centre. || 
|-id=361
| 21361 Carsonmark || 1997 HQ || Jordan Carson Mark (1913–1997) worked as a physicist and administrator at Los Alamos National Laboratory and as an advisor on the safety of nuclear reactors.. || 
|-id=362
| 21362 Dickarmstrong ||  || Richard Armstrong (1937–1991) studied radiogenic isotope geochemistry, geology of the American Cordillera, geochronology, and Earth's geochemical evolution. || 
|-id=363
| 21363 Jotwani ||  || Pooja Sunil Jotwani, American finalist in the 2005 ISTS † || 
|-id=364
| 21364 Lingpan ||  || Ling Pan, American finalist in the 2005 ISTS † || 
|-id=367
| 21367 Edwardpleva ||  || Edward Gustav Pleva (1912–2008), a geography educator who taught for 39 years at Western University and was editor of The Canadian Oxford School Atlas.   || 
|-id=368
| 21368 Shiodayama ||  || Shiodayama is a 406-m mountain located in the north of the discoverer's home town, Shirataka, Yamagata prefecture, Japan || 
|-id=369
| 21369 Gertfinger ||  || Gert Finger, of the European Southern Observatory, leader in the use of infrared sensors in the highest quality instrumentation || 
|-id=375
| 21375 Fanshawe ||  || Located in London, Canada, Fanshawe College was founded in 1967, and developed a particular reputation for arts, media, landscape design and hospitality studies. Name suggested by R. and P. Jedicke. || 
|-id=380
| 21380 Devanssay ||  || Jean Benoît De Vanssay, French amateur astronomer and optician || 
|-id=387
| 21387 Wafakhalil ||  || Wafa Khalil, Intel International Science and Engineering Fair (ISEF) Excellence in Teaching Award winner for 2004 † || 
|-id=388
| 21388 Moyanodeburt ||  || Maria Adela Moyano de Burt, Intel ISEF Excellence in Teaching Award winner for 2004 † || 
|-id=389
| 21389 Pshenichka ||  || Paul Pshenichka, Intel ISEF Excellence in Teaching Award winner for 2004 † || 
|-id=390
| 21390 Shindo ||  || Shindo Akihiko, Intel ISEF Excellence in Teaching Award winner for 2004 † || 
|-id=391
| 21391 Rotanner ||  || Roberta Tanner, Intel ISEF Excellence in Teaching Award winner for 2004 † || 
|-id=392
| 21392 Helibrochier ||  || Hélio Luiz Brochier, Intel ISEF Excellence in Teaching Award winner for 2003 † || 
|-id=393
| 21393 Kalygeringer ||  || Karen Lynn Geringer, American finalist in the 2005 Intel Science Talent Search (ISTS) † || 
|-id=394
| 21394 Justinbecker ||  || Justin Scott Becker, American finalist in the 2005 ISTS † || 
|-id=395
| 21395 Albertofilho ||  || Alberto Dal Molin Filho, Intel International Science and Engineering Fair (ISEF) Excellence in Teaching Award winner for 2003 † || 
|-id=396
| 21396 Fisher-Ives ||  || Russ Fisher-Ives, Intel ISEF Excellence in Teaching Award winner for 2003 † || 
|-id=397
| 21397 Leontovich ||  || Alexander Leontovich, Intel ISEF Excellence in Teaching Award winner for 2003 † || 
|-id=398
| 21398 Zengguoshou ||  || Zeng Guoshou, Intel ISEF Excellence in Teaching Award winner for 2003 † || 
|-id=399
| 21399 Bateman ||  || Ailish Elizabeth Bateman, American finalist in the 2005 Intel Science Talent Search (ISTS) † || 
|-id=400
| 21400 Ahdout ||  || Zimra Payvand Ahdout, American finalist in the 2006 Intel International Science and Engineering Fair (ISEF) † || 
|}

21401–21500 

|-
| 21401 Justinkovac ||  || Justin Alexander Kovac, American Intel Science Talent Search (ISTS) 2005 finalist † || 
|-id=402
| 21402 Shanhuang ||  || Shan Yuan Huang, American ISTS 2005 finalist † || 
|-id=403
| 21403 Haken ||  || Ian Robert Haken, American ISTS 2005 finalist † || 
|-id=404
| 21404 Atluri ||  || Kamalakar Atluri, American finalist in the 2006 Intel International Science and Engineering Fair (ISEF) † || 
|-id=405
| 21405 Sagarmehta ||  || Sagar Viplov Mehta, American Intel Science Talent Search (ISTS) 2005 finalist † || 
|-id=406
| 21406 Jimyang ||  || Jimmy Chen Yang, American ISTS 2005 finalist † || 
|-id=407
| 21407 Jessicabaker ||  || Jessica Leann Baker, American finalist in the 2006 Intel International Science and Engineering Fair (ISEF) † || 
|-id=408
| 21408 Lyrahaas ||  || Lyra Creamer Haas, American Intel Science Talent Search (ISTS) 2005 finalist † || 
|-id=409
| 21409 Forbes ||  || Michael Andrew Forbes, American ISTS 2005 finalist † || 
|-id=410
| 21410 Cahill ||  || James Andrew Cahill, American ISTS 2005 finalist † || 
|-id=411
| 21411 Abifraeman ||  || Abigail Ann Fraeman, American ISTS 2005 finalist † || 
|-id=412
| 21412 Sinchanban ||  || Sinchan Banerjee, American finalist in the 2006 Intel International Science and Engineering Fair (ISEF)
|-id=413
| 21413 Albertsao ||  || Albert Tsao, American ISTS 2005 finalist † || 
|-id=414
| 21414 Blumenthal ||  || Daniel Abraham Blumenthal, American finalist in the 2006 Intel International Science and Engineering Fair (ISEF) † || 
|-id=415
| 21415 Nicobrenner ||  || Nicole Rachelle Brenner, American finalist in the 2006 Intel ISEF † || 
|-id=416
| 21416 Sisichen ||  || Sisi Monica Chen, American Intel Science Talent Search (ISTS) 2005 finalist † || 
|-id=417
| 21417 Kelleyharris ||  || Kelley Harris, American ISTS 2005 finalist † || 
|-id=418
| 21418 Bustos ||  || Miguel Angel Bustos, American finalist in the 2006 Intel International Science and Engineering Fair (ISEF) † || 
|-id=419
| 21419 Devience ||  || Stephen Jacob DeVience, American Intel Science Talent Search (ISTS) 2005 finalist † || 
|-id=421
| 21421 Nealwadhwa ||  || Neal Wadhwa, American ISTS 2005 finalist † || 
|-id=422
| 21422 Alexacarey ||  || Alexa A. Carey, American finalist in the 2006 Intel International Science and Engineering Fair (ISEF) † || 
|-id=423
| 21423 Credo ||  || Timothy Frank Credo, American Intel Science Talent Search (ISTS) 2005 finalist † || 
|-id=424
| 21424 Faithchang ||  || Faith Kan Chang, American finalist in the 2006 Intel International Science and Engineering Fair (ISEF) † || 
|-id=425
| 21425 Cordwell ||  || Robert Thomas Cordwell, American Intel Science Talent Search (ISTS) 2005 finalist † || 
|-id=426
| 21426 Davidbauer ||  || David Lawrence Vigliarolo Bauer, American ISTS 2005 finalist † || 
|-id=427
| 21427 Ryanharrison ||  || Ryan Marques Harrison, American ISTS 2005 finalist † || 
|-id=428
| 21428 Junehokim ||  || June-Ho Kim, American ISTS 2005 finalist † || 
|-id=429
| 21429 Gulati ||  || Abhi Gulati, American ISTS 2005 finalist † || 
|-id=430
| 21430 Brubrew ||  || Bruce Xiangji Brewington, American ISTS 2005 finalist † || 
|-id=431
| 21431 Amberhess ||  || Amber Victoria Irish Hess, American ISTS 2005 finalist † || 
|-id=432
| 21432 Polingloh ||  || Po-Ling Loh, American ISTS 2005 finalist † || 
|-id=433
| 21433 Stekramer ||  || Stephen Curt Kramer, American ISTS 2005 finalist † || 
|-id=434
| 21434 Stanchiang ||  || Stanley Shang Chiang, American ISTS 2005 finalist † || 
|-id=435
| 21435 Aharon ||  || Terri Aharon, American mentor of a finalist in the 2005 ISTS † || 
|-id=436
| 21436 Chaoyichi ||  || Yi-Chi Chao, Taiwanese finalist in the 2006 Intel International Science and Engineering Fair (ISEF) and Seaborg Stockholm International Youth Science Seminar (SIYSS) Award recipient † || 
|-id=437
| 21437 Georgechen ||  || George Chen, American finalist in the 2006 Intel ISEF and International Movement for Leisure in Science and Technology (MILSET) winner † || 
|-id=438
| 21438 Camibarnett ||  || Camille Barnett, American mentor of a finalist in the 2005 Intel Science Talent Search (ISTS) † || 
|-id=439
| 21439 Robenzing ||  || Robert Benzing, American mentor of a finalist in the 2005 ISTS † || 
|-id=440
| 21440 Elizacollins ||  || Eliza Collins, American mentor of a finalist in the 2005 ISTS † || 
|-id=441
| 21441 Stevencondie ||  || Steven Condie, Illinois Mathematics and Science Academy (IMSA) Edyth May Sliffe Award for Distinguished High School Mathematics Teaching winner for 2002 also mentored a finalist in the 2005 ISTS † || 
|-id=445
| 21445 Pegconnolly ||  || Peggy Connolly, American mentor of a finalist in the 2005 ISTS † || 
|-id=446
| 21446 Tedflint ||  || Ted Flint, American mentor of a finalist in the 2005 ISTS † || 
|-id=447
| 21447 Yungchieh ||  || Yung-Chieh Chen, Taiwanese finalist in the 2006 Intel International Science and Engineering Fair (ISEF) † || 
|-id=448
| 21448 Galindo ||  || Armando Galindo, American mentor of a finalist in the 2005 Intel Science Talent Search (ISTS) † || 
|-id=449
| 21449 Hemmick ||  || Lucinda Hemmick, American mentor of a finalist in the 2005 ISTS † || 
|-id=450
| 21450 Kissel ||  || Stacy Kissel, American mentor of a finalist in the 2005 ISTS † || 
|-id=451
| 21451 Fisher ||  || Sir Ronald Fisher, English biologist and statistician || 
|-id=453
| 21453 Victorlevine ||  || Victor Levine, American mentor of a finalist in the 2005 Intel Science Talent Search (ISTS) † || 
|-id=454
| 21454 Chernoby ||  || Grant Fabian Chernoby, American finalist in the 2006 Intel International Science and Engineering Fair (ISEF) † || 
|-id=455
| 21455 Mcfarland ||  || Jennifer McFarland, American mentor of a finalist in the 2005 Intel Science Talent Search (ISTS) † || 
|-id=456
| 21456 Myers ||  || Robert Myers, American mentor of a finalist in the 2005 ISTS † || 
|-id=457
| 21457 Fevig ||  || Ronald A. Fevig, American planetary scientist at the University of North Dakota || 
|-id=458
| 21458 Susank ||  || Susan D. Benecchi, née Kern ("Susan K"), American postdoctoral researcher at the Space Telescope Science Institute, Baltimore || 
|-id=459
| 21459 Chrisrussell ||  || Christopher T. Russell, American professor of geophysics and planetary physics at the University of California, Los Angeles, and principal investigator of the Dawn mission to 1 Ceres and 4 Vesta || 
|-id=460
| 21460 Ryozo ||  || Ryozo Suzuki, Japanese amateur astronomer || 
|-id=461
| 21461 Alexchernyak ||  || Alexander Chernyak, American finalist in the 2006 Intel International Science and Engineering Fair (ISEF) † || 
|-id=462
| 21462 Karenedbal ||  || Karen Nedbal, American mentor of a finalist in the 2005 Intel Science Talent Search (ISTS) † || 
|-id=463
| 21463 Nickerson ||  || Laura Nickerson, American mentor of a finalist in the 2005 ISTS † || 
|-id=464
| 21464 Chinaroonchai ||  || Tanongsak Chinaroonchai, Thai finalist in the 2006 Intel International Science and Engineering Fair (ISEF) † || 
|-id=465
| 21465 Michelepatt ||  || Michele Patterson, American mentor of a finalist in the 2005 Intel Science Talent Search (ISTS) † || 
|-id=466
| 21466 Franpelrine ||  || Frances Pelrine, American mentor of a finalist in the 2005 ISTS † || 
|-id=467
| 21467 Rosenstein ||  || Peter Rosenstein, American mentor of a finalist in the 2005 ISTS † || 
|-id=468
| 21468 Saylor ||  || Charlotte Saylor, American mentor of a finalist in the 2005 ISTS † || 
|-id=469
| 21469 Robschum ||  || Robert Schumacher, American mentor of a finalist in the 2005 ISTS † || 
|-id=470
| 21470 Frankchuang ||  || Frank Fu-Han Chuang, American finalist in the 2006 Intel International Science and Engineering Fair (ISEF) and International Movement for Leisure in Science and Technology (MILSET) winner † || 
|-id=471
| 21471 Pavelchvykov ||  || Pavel V. Chvykov, American finalist in the 2006 Intel International Science and Engineering Fair (ISEF) † || 
|-id=472
| 21472 Stimson ||  || George Stimson, American mentor of a finalist in the 2005 Intel Science Talent Search (ISTS) † || 
|-id=473
| 21473 Petesullivan ||  || Peter Sullivan, American mentor of a finalist in the 2005 ISTS † || 
|-id=474
| 21474 Pamelatsai ||  || Pamela Tsai, American mentor of a finalist in the 2005 ISTS † || 
|-id=475
| 21475 Jasonclain ||  || Jason Bernard Clain, American Second Place Winner at the 2006 Intel International Science and Engineering Fair (ISEF) † || 
|-id=476
| 21476 Petrie ||  || William Flinders Petrie, British surveyor and archaeologist, father of modern archaeology || 
|-id=477
| 21477 Terikdaly ||  || Terik Daly, American finalist in the 2006 Intel International Science and Engineering Fair (ISEF) † || 
|-id=478
| 21478 Maggiedelano ||  || Maggie Delano, American finalist in the 2006 Intel ISEF || 
|-id=479
| 21479 Marymartha ||  || Mary Martha Ferrari Douglas, American finalist in the 2006 Intel ISEF † || 
|-id=480
| 21480 Jilltucker ||  || Jill Tucker, American mentor of a finalist in the 2005 Intel Science Talent Search (ISTS) † || 
|-id=481
| 21481 Johnwarren ||  || John Warren, American mentor of a finalist in the 2005 ISTS † || 
|-id=482
| 21482 Patashnick ||  || Harvey Patashnick, American mentor of a finalist in the 2005 ISTS † || 
|-id=483
| 21483 Abdulrasool ||  || Ameen Abdulrasool, American 2005 Intel International Science and Engineering Fair (ISEF) winner, and recipient of an Intel Young Scientist Award and a Seaborg Stockholm International Youth Science Seminar (SIYSS) Award || 
|-id=484
| 21484 Eppard ||  || Erin F. Eppard, American finalist in the 2006 Intel ISEF † || 
|-id=485
| 21485 Ash ||  || Lesley Elizabeth Ash, American 2005 Intel ISEF winner || 
|-id=488
| 21488 Danyellelee ||  || Danyelle Lee Evans, American finalist in the 2006 Intel ISEF † || 
|-id=495
| 21495 Feaga ||  || Lori Michele (Lanier) Feaga, American planetary spectroscopist || 
|-id=496
| 21496 Lijianyang ||  || Jianyang Li, American planetary scientist at the University of Maryland || 
|-id=497
| 21497 Alicehine ||  || Alice Hine, American radar data analyst at the Arecibo Observatory || 
|-id=498
| 21498 Keenanferar ||  || Keenan Joseph Ferar, American finalist in the 2006 Intel ISEF †  || 
|-id=499
| 21499 Perillat ||  || Phil Perillat, American senior software specialist at the Arecibo Observatory || 
|-id=500
| 21500 Vazquez ||  || Angel Vasquez, American PC network specialist and telescope operator at the Arecibo Observatory || 
|}

21501–21600 

|-
| 21501 Acevedo ||  || Tony Acevedo, American multimedia graphic designer and media officer at the Arecibo Observatory || 
|-id=502
| 21502 Cruz ||  || Jose Cruz, American operations group head and telescope operator at the Arecibo Observatory || 
|-id=503
| 21503 Beksha ||  || Daniel B. Beksha II, American 2005 Intel International Science and Engineering Fair (ISEF) winner †  || 
|-id=504
| 21504 Caseyfreeman ||  || Casey Jo Freeman, American finalist in the 2006 Intel ISEF † || 
|-id=505
| 21505 Bernert ||  || Michael James Bernert, American second-place winner in the 2005 Intel ISEF †  || 
|-id=506
| 21506 Betsill ||  || Alayna Rachelle Betsill, American second-place winner in the 2005 Intel ISEF †  || 
|-id=507
| 21507 Bhasin ||  || Jeffrey M. Bhasin, American winner in the 2005 Intel ISEF †  || 
|-id=508
| 21508 Benbrewer ||  || Benjamin Wayne Brewer, American second-place winner in the 2005 Intel ISEF †  || 
|-id=509
| 21509 Lucascavin ||  || Lucas James Cavin, American second-place winner in the 2005 Intel ISEF †  || 
|-id=510
| 21510 Chemnitz ||  || Mario Chemnitz, German second-place winner in the 2005 Intel ISEF †  || 
|-id=511
| 21511 Chiardola ||  || Hugo Gualterio Chiardola, Argentine second-place winner in the 2005 Intel ISEF †  || 
|-id=512
| 21512 Susieclary ||  || Susannah Lee Clary, American second-place winner in the 2005 Intel ISEF, and recipient of the Intel Foundation Achievement Award †  || 
|-id=513
| 21513 Bethcochran ||  || Elizabeth Jean Cochran, American winner in the 2005 Intel ISEF †  || 
|-id=514
| 21514 Gamalski ||  || Andrew David Gamalski, American finalist in the 2006 Intel ISEF † || 
|-id=515
| 21515 Gavini ||  || Madhavi Pulakat Gavini, American finalist in the 2006 Intel ISEF and Intel Foundation Young Scientist Award recipient † || 
|-id=516
| 21516 Mariagodinez ||  || Maria Estela Godniez, Mexican finalist in the 2006 Intel ISEF † || 
|-id=517
| 21517 Dobi ||  || Kledin Dobi, American winner in the 2005 Intel ISEF †  || 
|-id=518
| 21518 Maysunhasan ||  || Maysun Mazhar Hasan, American finalist in the 2006 Intel ISEF † || 
|-id=519
| 21519 Josephhenry ||  || Joseph Kent Henry, American finalist in the 2006 Intel ISEF † || 
|-id=520
| 21520 Dianaeheart ||  || Diana Lynn Eheart, American second-place winner in the 2005 Intel ISEF †  || 
|-id=521
| 21521 Hippalgaonkar ||  || Varun Rajendra Hippalgaonkar, American finalist in the 2006 Intel ISEF † || 
|-id=522
| 21522 Entwisle ||  || Richard William Entwisle, British winner in the 2005 Intel ISEF †  || 
|-id=523
| 21523 GONG ||  || National Solar Observatory's Global Oscillation Network Group † || 
|-id=526
| 21526 Mirano ||  || Mirano Silvestri, Italian amateur astronomer † || 
|-id=527
| 21527 Horton ||  || Douglas Ray Horton, American finalist in the 2006 Intel International Science and Engineering Fair (ISEF) † || 
|-id=528
| 21528 Chrisfaust ||  || Christina Lynn Faust, American winner in the 2005 Intel ISEF †  || 
|-id=529
| 21529 Johnjames ||  || John James Hutchison, American finalist in the 2006 Intel ISEF † || 
|-id=530
| 21530 Despiau ||  || Norberto Despiau, American staff technician and telescope operator at the Arecibo Observatory || 
|-id=531
| 21531 Billcollin || 1998 OS || Bill Collin, contributor to the design and manufacture of the Auxiliary Telescope System of the European Southern Observatory's Very Large Telescope || 
|-id=537
| 21537 Fréchet || 1998 PQ || Maurice René Fréchet, French mathematician || 
|-id=539
| 21539 Josefhlávka ||  || Josef Hlávka, Czech architect and philanthropist, founder of the Czech Academy of Science and Arts (1891–1952) || 
|-id=540
| 21540 Itthipanyanan ||  || Suksun Itthipanyanan, Thai finalist in the 2006 Intel International Science and Engineering Fair (ISEF) † || 
|-id=541
| 21541 Friskop ||  || Andrew John Friskop, American winner in the 2005 Intel ISEF †  || 
|-id=542
| 21542 Kennajeannet ||  || Kennan L. Jeannet, American finalist in the 2006 Intel ISEF † || 
|-id=543
| 21543 Jessop ||  || Forrest Connell Jessop, American finalist in the 2006 Intel ISEF † || 
|-id=544
| 21544 Hermainkhan ||  || Hermain Suhail Khan, American finalist in the 2006 Intel ISEF † || 
|-id=545
| 21545 Koirala ||  || Pratistha Koirala, American finalist in the 2006 Intel ISEF † || 
|-id=546
| 21546 Konermann ||  || Silvana Konermann, German finalist in the 2006 Intel ISEF † || 
|-id=547
| 21547 Kottapalli ||  || Anjaney Pramod Kottapalli, American finalist in the 2006 Intel ISEF † || 
|-id=548
| 21548 Briekugler ||  || Brienne Ashley Kugler, American finalist in the 2006 Intel ISEF † || 
|-id=549
| 21549 Carolinelang ||  || Caroline Janet Lang, American finalist in the 2006 Intel ISEF † || 
|-id=550
| 21550 Laviolette ||  || Jessica Lynn Laviolette, American finalist in the 2006 Intel ISEF † || 
|-id=551
| 21551 Geyang ||  || Ge Yang, Chinese second-place winner in the 2005 Intel ISEF †  || 
|-id=552
| 21552 Richardlee ||  || Richard C. Lee, American finalist in the 2006 Intel ISEF † || 
|-id=553
| 21553 Monchicourt ||  || Marie Odile Monchicourt, French science journalist, producer and host on Radio-France and France television  || 
|-id=554
| 21554 Leechaohsi ||  || Chao-Hsi Lee, Taiwanese finalist in the 2006 Intel ISEF † || 
|-id=555
| 21555 Levary ||  || David Andrew Levary, American finalist in the 2006 Intel ISEF † || 
|-id=556
| 21556 Christineli ||  || Christine Weizer Li, American finalist in the 2006 Intel ISEF † || 
|-id=557
| 21557 Daniellitt ||  || Daniel Abraham Litt, American finalist in the 2006 Intel ISEF † || 
|-id=558
| 21558 Alisonliu ||  || Alison W. Liu, American finalist in the 2006 Intel ISEF † || 
|-id=559
| 21559 Jingyuanluo ||  || Jingyuan Luo, American finalist in the 2006 Intel ISEF † || 
|-id=560
| 21560 Analyons ||  || Ana Marie Lyons, American finalist in the 2006 Intel ISEF † || 
|-id=561
| 21561 Masterman ||  || Mary Masterman, American finalist in the 2006 Intel ISEF † || 
|-id=562
| 21562 Chrismessick ||  || Christopher D. Messick, American finalist in the 2006 Intel ISEF † || 
|-id=563
| 21563 Chetgervais ||  || Chetley L. C. Gervais, Canadian winner in the 2005 Intel ISEF †  || 
|-id=564
| 21564 Widmanstätten ||  || Count Alois von Widmanstätten, 18th/19th-century Austrian chemist, who discovered the Widmanstätten patterns peculiar to iron meteorites || 
|-id=568
| 21568 Evanmorikawa ||  || Evan Takashi Morikawa, American finalist in the 2006 Intel ISEF † || 
|-id=570
| 21570 Muralidhar ||  || Vinayak Muralidhar, American finalist in the 2006 Intel ISEF † || 
|-id=571
| 21571 Naegeli ||  || Kaleb Markus Naegeli, American finalist in the 2006 Intel ISEF † || 
|-id=572
| 21572 Nguyen-McCarty ||  || Michelle Andrea Nguyen-McCarty, American finalist in the 2006 Intel ISEF † || 
|-id=574
| 21574 Ouzan ||  || Raphael Ouzan, Israeli finalist in the 2006 Intel ISEF † || 
|-id=575
| 21575 Padmanabhan ||  || Hamsa Padmanabhan, Indian finalist in the 2006 Intel ISEF † || 
|-id=576
| 21576 McGivney ||  || Michael J. McGivney, 19th-century parish priest of St. Mary's Church in New Haven, Connecticut, founder of the Knights of Columbus || 
|-id=577
| 21577 Negron ||  || Victor Negron, American electronics technician and transmitter operator at the Arecibo Observatory || 
|-id=580
| 21580 Portalatin ||  || Wilfredo Portalatin, American staff technician and telescope operator at the Arecibo Observatory || 
|-id=581
| 21581 Ernestoruiz ||  || Ernesto Ruiz, American electronics technician and telescope operator at the Arecibo Observatory || 
|-id=582
| 21582 Arunvenkataraman ||  || Arun Venkataraman, American head of the computer department of the Arecibo Observatory || 
|-id=583
| 21583 Caropietsch ||  || Caroline Elizabeth Pietsch, American finalist in the 2006 Intel ISEF † || 
|-id=584
| 21584 Polepeddi ||  || Lalith Kumar Polepeddi, American finalist in the 2006 Intel ISEF † || 
|-id=585
| 21585 Polmear ||  || Michael McCord Polmear, American finalist in the 2006 Intel ISEF † || 
|-id=586
| 21586 Pourkaviani ||  || Shahin Pourkaviani, American finalist in the 2006 Intel ISEF † || 
|-id=587
| 21587 Christopynn ||  || Christopher Donald Pynn, American finalist in the 2006 Intel ISEF † || 
|-id=588
| 21588 Gianelli ||  || Gabrielle Alyce Gianelli, American winner in the 2005 Intel ISEF and recipient of the Intel Young Scientist Award †  || 
|-id=589
| 21589 Rafes ||  || Courtney Anne Rafes, American finalist in the 2006 Intel ISEF † || 
|}

21601–21700 

|-id=602
| 21602 Ialmenus ||  || Ialmenus, son of Ares and Astyoche, one of the Achaean leaders, one of those who entered Troy in the Wooden Horse, an Argonaut, and a suitor of Helen †  || 
|-id=605
| 21605 Reynoso ||  || Jeremy Rosendo Reynoso, American finalist in the 2006 Intel ISEF || 
|-id=607
| 21607 Robel ||  || Alexander Abram Robel, American finalist in the 2006 Intel ISEF || 
|-id=608
| 21608 Gloyna ||  || Tara Ellen Gloyna, American second-place winner in the 2005 Intel ISEF || 
|-id=609
| 21609 Williamcaleb ||  || William Caleb Rodgers, American finalist in the 2006 Intel ISEF || 
|-id=610
| 21610 Rosengard ||  || Jamie Erin Rosengard, American finalist in the 2006 Intel ISEF || 
|-id=611
| 21611 Rosoff ||  || Matthew Scott Rosoff, American finalist in the 2006 Intel ISEF || 
|-id=612
| 21612 Chelsagloria ||  || Chelsea Gloria Gordon, American winner in the 2005 Intel ISEF, and recipient of the Intel Foundation Achievement Award †  || 
|-id=613
| 21613 Schlecht ||  || Alissa Raenelle Schlecht, American finalist in the 2006 Intel ISEF || 
|-id=614
| 21614 Grochowski ||  || Julia Caroline Grochowski, Canadian second-place winner in the 2005 Intel ISEF †  || 
|-id=615
| 21615 Guardamano ||  || Andrew Lacson Guardamano, Canadian second-place winner in the 2005 Intel ISEF †  || 
|-id=616
| 21616 Guhagilford ||  || Tristan Guha-Gilford, American second-place winner in the 2005 Intel ISEF †  || 
|-id=617
| 21617 Johnhagen ||  || John Thomas Hagen, American second-place winner in the 2005 Intel ISEF †  || 
|-id=618
| 21618 Sheikh ||  || Hamza Sheikh, Pakistani finalist in the 2006 Intel ISEF || 
|-id=619
| 21619 Johnshopkins ||  || Johns Hopkins, 19th-century American entrepreneur and philanthropist of Baltimore, Maryland, best known for his creation of The Johns Hopkins University and its affiliated institutions, including the Applied Physics Laboratory || 
|-id=621
| 21621 Sherman ||  || Eric Alan Sherman, American finalist in the 2006 Intel ISEF || 
|-id=622
| 21622 Victorshia ||  || Victor Andrew Shia, American finalist in the 2006 Intel ISEF and International Movement for Leisure in Science and Technology (MILSET) winner || 
|-id=623
| 21623 Albertshieh ||  || Albert David Shieh, American finalist in the 2006 Intel ISEF || 
|-id=625
| 21625 Seira ||  || Seira Shimoyama, Japanese finalist in the 2006 Intel ISEF || 
|-id=626
| 21626 Matthewhall ||  || Matthew J. Hall, American winner in the 2005 Intel ISEF || 
|-id=627
| 21627 Sillis ||  || Arnaud Georges Sillis, American finalist in the 2006 Intel ISEF || 
|-id=628
| 21628 Lucashof ||  || Lucas Hudson Hofmeister, American second-place winner in the 2005 Intel ISEF †  || 
|-id=629
| 21629 Siperstein ||  || Brian Furness Siperstein, American finalist in the 2006 Intel ISEF || 
|-id=630
| 21630 Wootensmith ||  || Lauren Wooten Smith, American finalist in the 2006 Intel ISEF || 
|-id=631
| 21631 Stephenhonan ||  || Stephen Goodwin Honan, American winner in the 2005 Intel ISEF †  || 
|-id=632
| 21632 Suwanasri ||  || Krongrath Suwanasri, Thai finalist in the 2006 Intel ISEF || 
|-id=633
| 21633 Hsingpenyuan ||  || Pen-Yuan Hsing, Taiwanese winner in the 2005 Intel ISEF, and recipient of the EU Contest for Young Scientists Award †  || 
|-id=634
| 21634 Huangweikang ||  || Huang Wei-Kang, Taiwanese winner in the 2005 Intel ISEF, and recipient of the EU Contest for Young Scientists Award †  || 
|-id=635
| 21635 Micahtoll ||  || Micah Lathaniel Toll, American finalist in the 2006 Intel ISEF || 
|-id=636
| 21636 Huertas ||  || Johiry Huertas, Puerto Rican second-place winner in the 2005 Intel ISEF †  || 
|-id=637
| 21637 Ninahuffman ||  || Nina Maria Huffman, American second-place winner in the 2005 Intel ISEF †  || 
|-id=638
| 21638 Nicjachowski ||  || Nicholas Robert Apau Jachowski, American winner in the 2005 Intel ISEF †  || 
|-id=639
| 21639 Davidkaufman ||  || David Brooks Kaufman, American second-place winner in the 2005 Intel ISEF †  || 
|-id=640
| 21640 Petekirkland ||  || Peter Jonathan Kirkland, Northern Irish winner in the 2005 Intel ISEF †  || 
|-id=641
| 21641 Tiffanyko ||  || Tiffany Sain-Yee Ko, American winner in the 2005 Intel ISEF †  || 
|-id=642
| 21642 Kominers ||  || Scott Duke Kominers, American second-place winner in the 2005 Intel ISEF †  || 
|-id=643
| 21643 Kornev ||  || Aleksey Borisovich Kornev, Russian second-place winner in the 2005 Intel ISEF †  || 
|-id=644
| 21644 Vinay ||  || Vinay Tripuraneni, American finalist in the 2006 Intel ISEF || 
|-id=645
| 21645 Chentsaiwei ||  || Chen Wei Tsai, Taiwanese finalist in the 2006 Intel ISEF || 
|-id=646
| 21646 Joshuaturner ||  || Joshua Robert Turner, American finalist in the 2006 Intel ISEF || 
|-id=647
| 21647 Carlturner ||  || Carl Anthony Turner, American finalist in the 2006 Intel ISEF || 
|-id=648
| 21648 Gravanschaik ||  || Graham William Wakefield Van Schaik, American finalist in the 2006 Intel ISEF || 
|-id=649
| 21649 Vardhana ||  || Anarghya A. Vardhana, American finalist in the 2006 Intel ISEF || 
|-id=650
| 21650 Tilgner ||  || Bruno Tilgner, of the European Space Agency, who helped the discoverer in identifying artificial satellites † || 
|-id=651
| 21651 Mission Valley ||  || Mission Valley High School, on the grounds of which is situated Farpoint Observatory || 
|-id=652
| 21652 Vasishtha ||  || Dhruv Vasishtha, American finalist in the 2006 Intel ISEF || 
|-id=653
| 21653 Davidwang ||  || David Jueyu Wang, Canadian finalist in the 2006 Intel ISEF || 
|-id=655
| 21655 Niklauswirth ||  || Niklaus Wirth (born 1934), Swiss computer scientist || 
|-id=656
| 21656 Knuth ||  || Donald Knuth (born 1938), American computer scientist || 
|-id=659
| 21659 Fredholm ||  || Erik Ivar Fredholm (1866–1927), Swedish mathematician || 
|-id=660
| 21660 Velenia ||  || Miroslav Velen (born 1972), who developed software for the reduction of photometric and astrometric data at Ondřejov Observatory † || 
|-id=661
| 21661 Olgagermani || 1999 RA || Olga Germani  (1900–1983), Italian poet || 
|-id=662
| 21662 Benigni || 1999 RC || Roberto Benigni, Italian actor and film director || 
|-id=663
| 21663 Banat || 1999 RM || Banat, a region in central Europe lying between Transylvania and Walachia, and the rivers Tisza, Mureş, and Danube, home of the Danube Swabians † || 
|-id=664
| 21664 Konradzuse ||  || Konrad Zuse, German engineer and computer pioneer || 
|-id=665
| 21665 Frege ||  || Friedrich Ludwig Gottlob Frege, German mathematician || 
|-id=670
| 21670 Kuan ||  || Aaron Tzeyang Kuan, American second-place winner in the 2005 Intel International Science and Engineering Fair (ISEF) †  || 
|-id=671
| 21671 Warrener ||  || Stephen Gerald Warrener, American finalist in the 2006 Intel ISEF || 
|-id=672
| 21672 Laichunju ||  || Lai Chun-Ju, Chinese second-place winner in the 2005 Intel ISEF †  || 
|-id=673
| 21673 Leatherman ||  || Amanda Kay Leatherman, American second-place winner in the 2005 Intel ISEF †  || 
|-id=674
| 21674 Renaldowebb ||  || Renaldo Michael Webb, American finalist in the 2006 Intel ISEF || 
|-id=675
| 21675 Kaitlinmaria ||  || Kaitlin Maria Luther, American second-place winner in the 2005 Intel ISEF †  || 
|-id=676
| 21676 Maureenanne ||  || Maureen Anne Williams, American finalist in the 2006 Intel ISEF || 
|-id=677
| 21677 Tylerlyon ||  || Tyler Glen Lyon, American second-place winner in the 2005 Intel ISEF †  || 
|-id=678
| 21678 Lindner ||  || Klaus Lindner (born 1935), German school teacher of astronomy and author || 
|-id=679
| 21679 Bettypalermiti ||  || Betty M. Palermiti, American dental hygienist and optical specialist, Pro Class drag-racing driver, and wife of amateur astronomer Michael Palermiti of Palermiti Observatory, Jupiter, Florida || 
|-id=680
| 21680 Richardschwartz ||  || Richard K. Schwartz (1933–1998), American amateur astronomer and pioneer of the CCD revolution † || 
|-id=682
| 21682 Peštafrantišek ||  || František Pešta (1905–1982), Czech founder of the popular observatory (Hvězdárna Františka Pešty) in Sezimovo Ústí † || 
|-id=683
| 21683 Segal ||  || Bruce A. Segal (born 1959), American and amateur astronomer and discoverer of minor planets. He is an eye physician and surgeon by profession. || 
|-id=684
| 21684 Alinafiocca ||  || Alina Fiocca, young daughter of close friends of the discoverers †  || 
|-id=685
| 21685 Francomallia ||  || Franco Mallia (born 1961), Italian amateur astronomer and discoverer of minor planets || 
|-id=686
| 21686 Koschny ||  || Detlef Koschny (born 1962), German aerospace engineer and amateur astronomer, Planetary Science Operations Manager at ESA's Planetary Missions † ‡ || 
|-id=687
| 21687 Filopanti ||  || Quirico Filopanti, pseudonym of Giuseppe Barilli, Italian patriot, author, and professor of mathematics at Bologna University || 
|-id=694
| 21694 Allisowilson ||  || Allison Ruth Wilson, American finalist in the 2006 Intel International Science and Engineering Fair (ISEF) || 
|-id=695
| 21695 Hannahwolf ||  || Hannah Louise Wolf, American finalist in the 2006 Intel ISEF and Intel Foundation Young Scientist Award recipient || 
|-id=696
| 21696 Ermalmquist ||  || Eric Ragnarson Malmquist, American second-place winner in the 2005 Intel ISEF †  || 
|-id=697
| 21697 Mascharak ||  || Smita Mascharak, American second-place winner in the 2005 Intel ISEF †  || 
|-id=698
| 21698 McCarron ||  || Tara Anne McCarron, American second-place winner in the 2005 Intel ISEF †  || 
|-id=699
| 21699 Wolpert ||  || Maya Nina Wolpert, American winner in the 2006 Intel ISEF || 
|-id=700
| 21700 Caseynicole ||  || Casey Nicole McDonald, American second-place winner in the 2005 Intel ISEF †  || 
|}

21701–21800 

|-
| 21701 Gabemendoza ||  || Gabriel Joel Mendoza, American second-place winner in the 2005 Intel International Science and Engineering Fair (ISEF) † || 
|-id=702
| 21702 Prisymendoza ||  || Priscilla Yvette Mendoza, American second-place winner in the 2005 Intel ISEF † || 
|-id=703
| 21703 Shravanimikk ||  || Shravani Mikkilineni, American second-place winner in the 2005 Intel ISEF † || 
|-id=704
| 21704 Mikkilineni ||  || Sohan Venkat Mikkilineni, American second-place winner in the 2005 Intel ISEF † || 
|-id=705
| 21705 Subinmin ||  || Su Bin Min, South Korean second-place winner in the 2005 Intel ISEF † || 
|-id=706
| 21706 Robminehart ||  || Robert Francis Minehart III, American second-place winner in the 2005 Intel ISEF † || 
|-id=707
| 21707 Johnmoore ||  || John Pease Moore IV, American second-place winner in the 2005 Intel ISEF, and recipient of the Intel Foundation Achievement Award † || 
|-id=708
| 21708 Mulhall ||  || Michael Mulhall, Irish winner in the 2005 Intel ISEF † || 
|-id=709
| 21709 Sethmurray ||  || Seth Asa Murray, American second-place winner in the 2005 Intel ISEF † || 
|-id=710
| 21710 Nijhawan ||  || Sonia Nijhawan, American second-place winner in the 2005 Intel ISEF † || 
|-id=711
| 21711 Wilfredwong ||  || Wilfred Chung-Him Wong, American finalist in the 2006 Intel ISEF † || 
|-id=712
| 21712 Obaid ||  || Sami Obaid, Canadian second-place winner in the 2005 Intel ISEF † || 
|-id=713
| 21713 Michaelolson ||  || Michael R. Olson, American winner in the 2005 Intel ISEF, and recipient of the MILSET Expo-Science Award † || 
|-id=714
| 21714 Geoffreywoo ||  || Geoffrey Hubert Woo, American finalist in the 2006 Intel ISEF † || 
|-id=715
| 21715 Palaniappan ||  || Anand M. Palaniappan, American second-place winner in the 2005 Intel ISEF, and recipient of the Intel Foundation Achievement Award † || 
|-id=716
| 21716 Panchamia ||  || Rohan Kirit Panchamia, American second-place winner in the 2005 Intel ISEF † || 
|-id=717
| 21717 Pang ||  || Genevieve C. Pang, American second-place winner in the 2005 Intel ISEF † || 
|-id=718
| 21718 Cheonghapark ||  || Cheong Ha Park, South Korean second-place winner in the 2005 Intel ISEF † || 
|-id=719
| 21719 Pasricha ||  || Trisha Satya Pasricha, American second-place winner in the 2005 Intel ISEF † || 
|-id=720
| 21720 Pilishvili ||  || Anna Pilishvili, American second-place winner in the 2005 Intel ISEF † || 
|-id=721
| 21721 Feiniqu ||  || Feini Qu, American winner in the 2005 Intel ISEF, and recipient of the Intel Foundation Achievement Award † || 
|-id=722
| 21722 Rambhia ||  || Suraj Hitendra Rambhia, American winner in the 2005 Intel ISEF † || 
|-id=723
| 21723 Yinyinwu ||  || Yin Yin Wu, American finalist in the 2006 Intel ISEF † || 
|-id=724
| 21724 Ratai ||  || Daniel Ratai, Hungarian winner in the 2005 Intel ISEF, and recipient of the Intel Foundation Achievement Award and the Seaborg SIYSS Award † || 
|-id=725
| 21725 Zhongyuechen ||  || Zhong Yuechen (born 1988) was awarded second place in the 2006 Intel International Science and Engineering Fair for her botany project. She attends the Beijing No.101 Middle School, Beijing, China. || 
|-id=726
| 21726 Rezvanian ||  || Jason Hamid Rezvanian, American second-place winner in the 2005 Intel ISEF † || 
|-id=727
| 21727 Rhines ||  || Allison Shelton Rhines, American second-place winner in the 2005 Intel ISEF † || 
|-id=728
| 21728 Zhuzhirui ||  || Zhirui Zhu, Chinese finalist in the 2006 Intel ISEF † || 
|-id=729
| 21729 Kimrichards ||  || Kimberly Skye Richards, Canadian second-place winner in the 2005 Intel ISEF † || 
|-id=730
| 21730 Ignaciorod ||  || Ignacio Gabriel Rodriguez, Argentine second-place winner in the 2005 Intel ISEF † || 
|-id=731
| 21731 Zhuruochen ||  || RuoChen Zhu, Chinese finalist in the 2006 Intel ISEF † || 
|-id=732
| 21732 Rumery ||  || Rhett Lee Rumery, American second-place winner in the 2005 Intel ISEF † || 
|-id=733
| 21733 Schlottmann ||  || Chad Avery Schlottmann, American winner in the 2005 Intel ISEF, and recipient of the MILSET Expo-Science Award † || 
|-id=735
| 21735 Nissaschmidt ||  || Nissa Leigh Schmidt, American second-place winner in the 2005 Intel ISEF † || 
|-id=736
| 21736 Samaschneid ||  || Samantha Leigh Schneider, American second-place winner in the 2005 Intel ISEF † || 
|-id=737
| 21737 Stephenshulz ||  || Stephen Schulz, German winner in the 2005 Intel ISEF, and recipient of the Intel Foundation Achievement Award, the Intel Young Scientist Award, and the Seaborg SIYSS Award † || 
|-id=738
| 21738 Schwank ||  || Benjamin Albert Schwank was awarded first place and Best in Category in the 2005 Intel ISEF † || 
|-id=739
| 21739 Annekeschwob ||  || Anneke Ellen Schwob, American second-place winner in the 2005 Intel ISEF † || 
|-id=742
| 21742 Rachaelscott ||  || Rachael Ann Scott, American winner in the 2005 Intel ISEF † || 
|-id=743
| 21743 Michaelsegal ||  || Michael Segal, American winner in the 2005 Intel ISEF † || 
|-id=744
| 21744 Meliselinger ||  || Melissa C. Selinger, American second-place winner in the 2005 Intel ISEF † || 
|-id=745
| 21745 Shadfan ||  || Basil Harbi Shadfan, American second-place winner in the 2005 Intel ISEF † || 
|-id=746
| 21746 Carrieshaw ||  || Carrie Elizabeth Shaw, American second-place winner in the 2005 Intel ISEF † || 
|-id=747
| 21747 Justsolomon ||  || Justin Moore Solomon, American winner in the 2005 Intel ISEF † || 
|-id=748
| 21748 Srinivasan ||  || Harish Mayur Srinivasan, American second-place winner in the 2005 Intel ISEF † || 
|-id=750
| 21750 Tartakahashi ||  || Taryn Mahealani Takahashi, American second-place winner in the 2005 Intel ISEF † || 
|-id=751
| 21751 Jennytaylor ||  || Jennifer Ann Taylor, American second-place winner in the 2005 Intel ISEF † || 
|-id=752
| 21752 Johnthurmon ||  || John Thomas Thurmon, American second-place winner in the 2005 Intel ISEF † || 
|-id=753
| 21753 Trudel ||  || Thomas Andrew Trudel, American second-place winner in the 2005 Intel ISEF † || 
|-id=754
| 21754 Tvaruzkova ||  || Zuzana Tvaruzkova, Czech winner in the 2005 Intel ISEF † || 
|-id=758
| 21758 Adrianveres ||  || Adrian Veres, Romanian-born Canadian winner in the 2005 Intel ISEF † || 
|-id=770
| 21770 Wangyiran ||  || Wang YiRan, Chinese second-place winner in the 2005 Intel ISEF † || 
|-id=774
| 21774 O'Brien ||  || David P. O'Brien (born 1976), an American planetary scientist at the Planetary Science Institute, Tucson, whose research includes the collisional evolution of the asteroid belt, leaving craters on main-belt asteroids such as 951 Gaspra. He also investigates the shaping of the asteroid belt during the accretion of the primordial protoplanetary disk. || 
|-id=775
| 21775 Tsiganis ||  || Kleomenis Tsiganis (born 1974), a Greek planetary scientist at the University of Thessaloniki, whose research includes the chaotic diffusion of minor planets and the impact of the Late Heavy Bombardment on the structure of the asteroid belt and the Trojan camps. || 
|-id=776
| 21776 Kryszczyńska ||  || Agnieszka Kryszczyńska (born 1965) is a Polish planetary scientist at Adam Mickiewicz University, Poznań. Using photometry, she has studied the physical properties of minor planets. She discovered the binary nature of (809) Lundia and maintains a database of the pole coordinates and shapes of minor planets. || 
|-id=778
| 21778 Andrewarren ||  || Andrew David Warren, American second-place winner in the 2005 Intel ISEF † || 
|-id=782
| 21782 Davemcdonald ||  || David McDonald (born 1964), Irish amateur astronomer, discoverer of minor planets and astronomy promoter || 
|-id=785
| 21785 Méchain ||  || Pierre Méchain (1744–1804), a French astronomer and discoverer of many comets and deep-sky objects. A colleague and friend of Messier, he contributed much to Messier's catalogue of nebulae. || 
|-id=789
| 21789 Frankwasser ||  || Francis Wasser, Irish winner in the 2005 Intel International Science and Engineering Fair (ISEF) † || 
|-id=791
| 21791 Mattweegman ||  || Matt Moraco Weegman, American second-place winner in the 2005 Intel ISEF † || 
|-id=795
| 21795 Masi ||  || Gianluca Masi (born 1972), Italian astrophysicist and "amateur" astronomer, as well as a science communicator || 
|-id=798
| 21798 Mitchweegman ||  || Mitch Dale Weegman, American second-place winner in the 2005 Intel International Science and Engineering Fair (ISEF) † || 
|-id=799
| 21799 Ciociaria || 1999 TP || Ciociaria, region of Italy comprising the southern Latium, southern Abruzzo and Molise, which takes its name from the ciocia, the ancient footwear of its early inhabitants || 
|}

21801–21900 

|-
| 21801 Ančerl ||  || Karel Ančerl (1908–1973), chief conductor of the Czech Philharmonic Orchestra || 
|-id=802
| 21802 Svoreň ||  || Ján Svoreň (born 1949), Slovak astronomer || 
|-id=804
| 21804 Václavneumann ||  || Václav Neumann (1920–1995), Czech violinist and viola player, chief conductor of the Czech Philharmonic Orchestra || 
|-id=811
| 21811 Burroughs ||  || Edgar Rice Burroughs (1875–1950), American author, best known for Tarzan of the Apes || 
|-id=813
| 21813 Danwinegar ||  || Daniel Rees Winegar, American second-place winner in the 2005 Intel International Science and Engineering Fair (ISEF) † || 
|-id=814
| 21814 Shanawolff ||  || Shana Marie Wolff, American winner in the 2005 Intel ISEF † || 
|-id=815
| 21815 Fanyang ||  || Fan Yang, American second-place winner in the 2005 Intel ISEF † || 
|-id=817
| 21817 Yingling ||  || Chelsey Ann Yingling, American second-place winner in the 2005 Intel ISEF † || 
|-id=818
| 21818 Yurkanin ||  || Alana Marie Yurkanin, American second-place winner in the 2005 Intel ISEF † || 
|-id=821
| 21821 Billryan ||  || William H. Ryan (born 1962), American astrophysicist at the New Mexico Institute of Mining and Technology's Magdalena Ridge Observatory (MRO), discoverer of the first binarity of a vestoid, 3782 Celle. His wife and collaborator at MRO is Eileen V. Ryan (Src) || 
|-id=822
| 21822 Degiorgi ||  || Ennio de Giorgi (1928–1996), Italian mathematician || 
|-id=825
| 21825 Zhangyizhong ||  || Zhang Yizhong, Chinese second-place winner in the 2005 Intel ISEF † || 
|-id=826
| 21826 Youjiazhong ||  || YouJia Zhong, Singaporean second-place winner in the 2005 Intel ISEF † || 
|-id=827
| 21827 Chingzhu ||  || Ching Zhu, American second-place winner in the 2005 Intel ISEF † || 
|-id=829
| 21829 Kaylacornale ||  || Kayla Marie Cornale, Canadian third-place winner in the 2005 Intel ISEF, and recipient of the Intel Foundation Achievement Award † || 
|-id=840
| 21840 Ghoshchoudhury ||  || Triparna Ghosh-Choudhury, American third-place winner in the 2005 Intel ISEF, and recipient of the Intel Foundation Achievement Award † || 
|-id=846
| 21846 Wojakowski ||  || Maria Malgorzata Wojakowski, American fourth-place winner in the 2005 Intel ISEF, and recipient of the Intel Foundation Achievement Award † || 
|-id=850
| 21850 Abshir ||  || Iftin Mohamed Abshir, American finalist in the 2005 Discovery Channel Young Scientist Challenge (DCYSC) † || 
|-id=852
| 21852 Bolander ||  || John Anthony Bolander, American finalist in the 2005 DCYSC † || 
|-id=853
| 21853 Kelseykay ||  || Kelsey Kay Burnham, American finalist in the 2005 DCYSC † || 
|-id=854
| 21854 Brendandwyer ||  || Brendan John Dwyer, American finalist in the 2005 DCYSC † || 
|-id=856
| 21856 Heathermaria ||  || Heather Maria Foster, American finalist in the 2005 DCYSC † || 
|-id=858
| 21858 Gosal ||  || Anudeep D. Gosal, American finalist in the 2005 DCYSC † || 
|-id=860
| 21860 Joannaguy ||  || Joanna Christine Guy, American finalist in the 2005 DCYSC † || 
|-id=861
| 21861 Maryhedberg ||  || Mary Lucia Hedberg, American finalist in the 2005 DCYSC † || 
|-id=862
| 21862 Joshuajones ||  || Joshua Steven Jones, American finalist in the 2005 DCYSC † || 
|-id=873
| 21873 Jindřichůvhradec ||  || The Czech town of Jindřichův Hradec, location of the popular observatory named after František Nušl || 
|-id=887
| 21887 Dipippo ||  || Simonetta Di Pippo (born 1959), Italian astrophysicist and science coordinator for the Italian Space Agency || 
|-id=888
| 21888 Ďurech ||  || Josef Ďurech (born 1974), Czech astronomer at the Astronomický Ústav Univerzity Karlovy (Astronomical Institute, Charles University), Prague || 
|-id=891
| 21891 Andreabocelli ||  || Andrea Bocelli (born 1958) is an Italian tenor renowned worldwide as a pop music, opera and crossover performer. He has sold over 80 million CDs worldwide and in 2010 received a star on the Hollywood Walk of Fame for his contribution to live theater || 
|-id=900
| 21900 Orus ||  || Orus, an Achaean warrior who was killed by Hektor in Homer's Iliad. || 
|}

21901–22000 

|-id=903
| 21903 Wallace ||  || Patrick T. Wallace, British specialist in telescope control software, currently head of Her Majesty's Nautical Almanac Office || 
|-id=913
| 21913 Taylorjones ||  || Taylor Wesley Jones, American finalist in the 2005 Discovery Channel Young Scientist Challenge (DCYSC) †  || 
|-id=914
| 21914 Melakabinoff ||  || Melanie Paige Kabinoff, American finalist in the 2005 DCYSC †  || 
|-id=915
| 21915 Lavins ||  || Gregory M. Lavins, American finalist in the 2005 DCYSC †  || 
|-id=919
| 21919 Luga ||  || Melissa Pomaikai Akiko Luga, American finalist in the 2005 DCYSC †  || 
|-id=921
| 21921 Camdenmiller ||  || Camden Yinhung Miller, American finalist in the 2005 DCYSC †  || 
|-id=922
| 21922 Mocz ||  || Lucia Mocz, American finalist in the 2005 DCYSC †  || 
|-id=924
| 21924 Alyssaovaitt ||  || Alyssa Kurtz Ovaitt, American finalist in the 2005 DCYSC †  || 
|-id=925
| 21925 Supasternak ||  || Susan Marie Pasternak, American finalist in the 2005 DCYSC †  || 
|-id=926
| 21926 Jacobperry ||  || Jacob P. Perry, American finalist in the 2005 DCYSC †  || 
|-id=927
| 21927 Sarahpierz ||  || Sarah Marie Pierz, American finalist in the 2005 DCYSC †  || 
|-id=928
| 21928 Prabakaran ||  || Sabrina Lakshmi Prabakran, American finalist in the 2005 DCYSC †  || 
|-id=929
| 21929 Nileshraval ||  || Nilesh Kaushik Raval, American finalist in the 2005 DCYSC †  || 
|-id=932
| 21932 Rios ||  || Roberto Andres Rios, Puerto Rican finalist in the 2005 DCYSC †  || 
|-id=933
| 21933 Aaronrozon ||  || Aaron Alexander Rozon, American finalist in the 2005 DCYSC †  || 
|-id=936
| 21936 Ryan ||  || Colleen Marie Ryan, American finalist in the 2005 DCYSC †  || 
|-id=937
| 21937 Basheehan ||  || Brittany Ann Sheehan, American finalist in the 2005 DCYSC †  || 
|-id=939
| 21939 Kasmith ||  || Katherine Ann Smith, American finalist in the 2005 DCYSC †  || 
|-id=942
| 21942 Subramanian ||  || Narayan Swamy Subramanian, American finalist in the 2005 DCYSC †  || 
|-id=945
| 21945 Kleshchonok ||  || Valery Volodymyrovich Kleshchonok, Ukrainian astronomer at the Astronomical Observatory of Kyiv Shevchenko National University || 
|-id=949
| 21949 Tatulian ||  || Adrian Surenovich Tatulian, American finalist in the 2005 DCYSC †  || 
|-id=952
| 21952 Terry ||  || Bailey Holly Terry, American finalist in the 2005 DCYSC †  || 
|-id=956
| 21956 Thangada ||  || Neela Devi Thangada, American finalist in the 2005 DCYSC †  || 
|-id=958
| 21958 Tripuraneni ||  || Nilesh Tripuraneni, American finalist in the 2005 DCYSC †  || 
|-id=962
| 21962 Scottsandford ||  || Scott Alan Sandford, American astronomer and meteoriticist at NASA's Ames Research Center, a co-investigator on the Stardust mission || 
|-id=964
| 21964 Kevinhousen ||  || Kevin R. Housen, American associate technical fellow at the Boeing Corporation, a pioneer in the study of asteroidal collision || 
|-id=965
| 21965 Dones ||  || Henry C. "Luke" Dones, American solar system dynamicist at the Southwest Research Institute in Boulder || 
|-id=966
| 21966 Hamadori ||  || Hamadori is a coastal region in Fukushima prefecture, Japan. || 
|-id=970
| 21970 Tyle || 1999 XC || Sheel Tyle, American finalist in the 2005 DCYSC †  || 
|-id=985
| 21985 Šejna ||  || Karel Šejna, conductor of the Czech Philharmonic Orchestra † || 
|-id=986
| 21986 Alexanduribe ||  || Alexander Tyler Uribe, American finalist in the 2005 Discovery Channel Young Scientist Challenge (DCYSC) †  || 
|-id=989
| 21989 Werntz ||  || Ruslan Alan Werntz, American finalist in the 2005 DCYSC †  || 
|-id=990
| 21990 Garretyazzie ||  || Garrett Michael Yazzie, American finalist in the 2005 DCYSC †  || 
|-id=991
| 21991 Zane ||  || Robert Teruo Zane, American finalist in the 2005 DCYSC †  || 
|-id=999
| 21999 Disora ||  || Mario Di Sora, Italian lawyer and amateur astronomer, founder and manager of the Osservatorio Astronomico di Campo Catino (Campo Catino Observatory), light pollution fighter || 
|}

References 

021001-022000